Onoway is a town in central Alberta, Canada.

History 
Two theories are behind the naming of the community. "Onoway" in Chipewyan translates to "fair field" while the variant "onaway" is used in The Song of Hiawatha, a poem by Henry Wadsworth Longfellow. Onoway's post office was established in 1904. Onoway incorporated as a village on June 25, 1923. It incorporated as a town on September 1, 2005.

Geography 
The Canadian National Railway tracks run through the town, which is situated east of Lac Ste. Anne and south of the Sturgeon River.

Demographics 

In the 2016 Census of Population conducted by Statistics Canada, the Town of Onoway recorded a population of 1,029 living in 355 of its 374 total private dwellings, a  change from its 2011 population of 1,039.

Attractions 
Onoway hosts a weekend fair every June called "Heritage Days".

Education 

Onoway's elementary school was recently replaced. The previous elementary school has been repurposed as a public library and museum. A new junior/senior high school opened in late 2016. The previous school was demolished and redeveloped as an outdoor running track.

See also 
List of communities in Alberta
List of towns in Alberta

References

External links  

1923 establishments in Alberta
Lac Ste. Anne County
Towns in Alberta